The discography of Dermot Kennedy, an Irish singer-songwriter and musician. His debut compilation album, Dermot Kennedy, was released in January 2019. The album peaked at number four on the Irish Albums Chart. His debut studio album, Without Fear, was released in October 2019. The album peaked at number one on the Irish Albums Chart. The album includes the singles "Moments Passed", "Power Over Me", "Lost" and "Outnumbered".

Albums

Studio albums

Re-issues

Compilation albums

Extended plays

Singles

As lead artist

As featured artist

Promotional singles

Other charted songs

Songwriting credits

Notes

References

Discographies of Irish artists